The Birmingham Barons are a Minor League Baseball team based in Birmingham, Alabama. The team, which plays in the Southern League, is the Double-A affiliate of the Chicago White Sox and plays at Regions Field in downtown Birmingham. The current edition of the Barons was previously located in Montgomery, Alabama, and known as the Montgomery Rebels.

History
Most of the professional baseball teams that have played in Birmingham have used the name Barons. The current team began playing in Birmingham in 1981, having previously played in Montgomery, Alabama as the Montgomery Rebels. Like previous Barons teams, they played at Rickwood Field on a full-time basis from 1981 to 1987. Since then, they have only played at Rickwood on special occasions. Since 2013, the team plays at Regions Field in the downtown part of Birmingham.

Playoffs and championships
 Southern League playoff appearances (16): 1983, 1987, 1989, 1990, 1991, 1993, 2000, 2001, 2002, 2003, 2004, 2005, 2008, 2009, 2011, 2013
 Southern League championships (6): 1983, 1987, 1989, 1993, 2002, 2013
 Dixie Series championships (6): 1929, 1931, 1948, 1951, 1958, 1967

Television and radio
All Birmingham Barons games are televised live on MiLB.TV. All games are also broadcast on radio on either WJQX 100.5 FM, WJOX-FM 94.5 FM or WJOX-AM 690 AM. Birmingham Barons Hall-of-Fame broadcaster Curt Bloom is the broadcast commentator for both WERC and MiLB.TV and has been the voice of the Barons since 1992.

Roster

Notable Barons/A's

 Jeff Abbott
Tim Anderson
 Wilson Álvarez
 Dylan Axelrod
 Wally Backman (manager)
 Sal Bando
 Jason Bere
 Eddie Brinkman (manager)
 Vida Blue
 Britt Burns (pitching coach)
 Mark Buehrle
 Mike Cameron
 Bert Campaneris
 Phil Cavarretta (manager)
 Ron Coomer
 Joe Crede
 Rob Dibble
 Dave Duncan
 Ray Durham
 Darrell Evans
 Scott Eyre
 Rollie Fingers
 Terry Francona (manager)
 Jon Garland
 Brad Goldberg
 Burleigh Grimes
 Sam Hairston (bench coach) (Patriarch of the 3-generation Hairston MLB family) 
 Mike Heath (manager)
 Roberto Hernández
 Bo Jackson
 Reggie Jackson
 Bobby Jenks
 Howard Johnson
 Michael Jordan
 Paul Konerko
 Marcel Lachemann
 Rene Lachemann
 Tony La Russa
 Carlos Lee
 Paul Lindblad
 Rube Marquard
 Jack McDowell
 John McNamara (manager)
 Bob Melvin
 Jim Nash
 Blue Moon Odom
 Miguel Olivo
 Magglio Ordóñez
 Jake Peavy
 Rico Petrocelli (manager)
 Jimmy Piersall
 Aaron Poreda
 Johnny Riddle (player/manager)
 Luis Robert
 Aaron Rowand
 Joe Rudi
 Razor Shines (manager)
 Bill Stafford
 Wally Taylor
 Gene Tenace
 Bobby Thigpen
 Frank Thomas
 Pie Traynor
 Robin Ventura
 Omar Vizquel (manager)
 Phil Weintraub
 Bob Wickman

See also
 Birmingham Black Barons

References

External links
 Official website
 BirminghamProSports.com
 Birmingham Barons at Bhamwiki.com
 "Our Summer with Michael", newspaper story about Michael Jordan's season with the Barons

 
Baseball teams established in 1885
Chicago White Sox minor league affiliates
Detroit Tigers minor league affiliates
Oakland Athletics minor league affiliates
New York Yankees minor league affiliates
Boston Red Sox minor league affiliates
Pittsburgh Pirates minor league affiliates
Kansas City Athletics minor league affiliates
Philadelphia Athletics minor league affiliates
Cincinnati Reds minor league affiliates
Chicago Cubs minor league affiliates
Southern League (1964–present) teams
Southern League (1885–1899) teams
Professional baseball teams in Alabama
1885 establishments in Alabama
Double-A South teams